Glen R. Smith is an American farmer and businessman who serves as a current board member and former chairman of the Farm Credit Administration. In 1982, Smith co-founded Smith Land Service, a company that specializes in farm management, land appraisal, and farmland brokerage services. He also owns and serves as president of Smith Generation Farms, Inc., a family farm operation in western Iowa that includes 2,000 acres of corn and soybeans.

References

Living people
Iowa State University alumni
Trump administration personnel
Farmers from Iowa
Year of birth missing (living people)